Adegarahalli  is a centrally located village in Karnataka. The main occupation of the people is agriculture. Kannada  is the main language spoken.

Tourism 

Adegarahalli is a village situated near Peresandra. Peresandra is known for Chukkuli. It has a river and Nagavalli Betta, a hill, which has caves and a temple on its peak.

The hill station of Nandi Hills is situated nearby. The nearby region of Muddenahalli-Kanivenarayanapura is the birthplace of engineer, Sir Mokshagundam Visvesvaraya. There are several educational institutions situated in the region. The engineering institute SJCIT and Sri Bhagavan Sathya Sai Baba's school, university, and hospital are located near Adhegarahalli.

Skandagiri, also known as Kalavara Durga, is an ancient mountain fortress located approximately 3 km from Chikballapur. Overlooks Nandi Hills, Muddenahalli, and Kanivenarayanapura . Tourist activities conducted there include night treks and altitude camping.

Historic temples are situated in and near Adhegarahalli, including Ellode Sri Lakshmi Adinarayana Swamy Temple, which resides on top of the hill of Ellode, Gudibhanda Taluk, Chickballapur district and Rangasthala (Ranganatha Swami temple), which is situated around 5 km west of Chickballapur.

Places of interest
 Nandi Hills
 Muddenahalli/Kanivenarayanapura
 Skandagiri
 Bengaluru International Airport (in Devanahalli)

Gallery

External links
 Official website by District Administration
 Chickballapur Official Municipal Website
 Google Maps: Adhegarahalli
 Bing maps: Adhegarahalli
 Official website of the Government of Karnataka

Cities and towns in Chikkaballapur district